Leonard Adrian "Bill" Westmaas (28 May 1923 – 25 August 2011) was a Guyanese cricketer. He played in eight first-class matches for British Guiana from 1945 to 1948.

Westmaas was one of eight brothers who attended Queen's College, Guyana. An opening batsman, his highest score for British Guiana was 111 against Trinidad in 1946–47.

In the 1960s he was the office manager at the Albion Sugar Estate in Berbice. He and his wife Trixie had two daughters and a son.

See also
 List of Guyanese representative cricketers

References

External links
 

1923 births
2011 deaths
Alumni of Queen's College, Guyana
Guyanese cricketers
Guyana cricketers
Sportspeople from Georgetown, Guyana